The Vigilant Association of Philadelphia was an abolitionist organization founded in August 1837 in Philadelphia to "create a fund to aid colored persons in distress".  The initial impetus came from  Robert Purvis, who had served on a previous Committee of Twelve in 1834, and his father-in-law, businessman James Forten.

History 
Its executive was the Vigilant Committee of Philadelphia and its first president was a black dentist, James McCrummell.  Other abolitionists who helped included John Greenleaf Whittier, who helped form the committee and promoted the association in his newspaper Pennsylvania Freeman.

There were five members of the acting committee for the Vigilant Association of Philadelphia, which included Nathaniel W. Depee, William Still, Jacob C. White, Passmore Williamson, and Charles Wise.

In June 1842, future writer Harriet Jacobs was among the fugitive slaves who were aided by the Association.

References

Citations

Sources

External links
Historical records of Philadelphia Vigilant Association held at the Historical Society of Pennsylvania

African-American history in Philadelphia
American abolitionist organizations
Organizations based in Philadelphia
Underground Railroad in Pennsylvania
19th century in Philadelphia